Dolly Sohi Dhanowa is an Indian television actress, known for playing the leads in shows like Bhabhi, Kalash. Dolly returned to television with shows like Meri Aashiqui Tum Se Hi and Khoob Ladi Mardaani...Jhansi Ki Rani

Filmography

Television

References

External links
 

Actresses in Hindi television
Indian television actresses
Living people
Indian soap opera actresses
Actresses from Mumbai
Actors from Mumbai
Year of birth missing (living people)